Carmen Sáinz de la Maza y de la Serna (23 August 1940 – 14 January 2022) was a Spanish actress. She was  known for her performances in Juncal and Estudio 1 plays.

Biography 
Carmen Sáinz de la Maza y de la Serna was born in San Sebastián, Gipuzkoa, on 23 August 1940. She was however based in Madrid since her earliest childhood. She studied drama in Madrid. She took her first steps as an actress in theatre works (making her professional debut in a play of Five Finger Exercise), whereas she made her film debut in Canción de juventud (1962). She rose to prominence for her appearances in Estudio 1 televised plays.

Her most known television role was her performance as Julia Muñoz in Jaime de Armiñán's . She also featured in drama series .

She was married to Agustín Navarro (died 2001), whom with she had 3 children. She later had a relationship with José Luis López Vázquez.

She made her last film performance in 2010 drama Anything You Want. Late television credits include performances in Hospital Central, El Comisario, El pasado es mañana, El don de Alba, and Águila Roja, her last television appearance. She died on 14 January 2022 in Madrid.

Filmography

Film

Television

References 

1940 births
2022 deaths
Spanish television actresses
Spanish stage actresses
Spanish film actresses
20th-century Spanish actresses
21st-century Spanish actresses
People from San Sebastián